The 1975 Astro-Bluebonnet Bowl was a college football postseason bowl game that featured the Texas Longhorns and the Colorado Buffaloes.

Background
A loss to #2 Texas A&M in the final game of the season meant that Texas could not claim an outright Southwest Conference title. Colorado had finished 3rd in the Big Eight Conference. This was Colorado's first bowl game under Mallory, but their fourth overall bowl appearance of the decade, and their first Bluebonnet Bowl since 1971. This was the 8th straight bowl appearance for Texas and its first Bluebonnet Bowl appearance since 1966.

Game summary
 Colorado – Kunz 1 run (MacKenzie kick) 7–0 2:29 1Q
 Colorado – Logan 4 pass from Williams (MacKenzie kick) 14–0 12:42 2Q
 Texas – Jackson 21 pass from Marty Akins (Erxleben kick) 14–7 1:47 2Q
 Colorado – Hasselbeck 25 pass from Williams (MacKenzie kick) 21–7 0:24 2Q
 Texas – Walker 3 run from Akins pitch(kick blocked) 21–13 10:56 3Q
 Texas – T. Campbell 25 blocked punt return (E. Campbell pass from Marty Akins) 21–21 8:37 3Q
 Texas – Erxleben 55 FG 21–24 6:25 3Q
 Texas – Jones 4 run from Akins pitch (Erxleben kick) 21–31 3:15 3Q
 Texas – Jones 7 run from Akins pitch (Erxleben kick) 21–38 5:05 4Q

Aftermath
Royal retired the following season. Colorado went to the Orange Bowl that season, but lost. They did not win a bowl game until January 1991. Texas returned to the Bluebonnet Bowl three times, and Colorado returned once.

Statistics

References

Astro-Bluebonnet Bowl
Bluebonnet Bowl
Colorado Buffaloes football bowl games
Texas Longhorns football bowl games
Astro-Bluebonnet Bowl
Astro-Bluebonnet Bowl
1970s in Houston